James George Sieben (April 19, 1924 – November 9, 1998) was an American Major General and a former Adjutant General of the Minnesota National Guard, a position he served for thirteen years from 1975 to 1988.

Career
Born in Hastings, Minnesota, Sieben began his military career as an enlisted infantryman in World War II. He served with the 104th Infantry Division in Europe until 1945, and returned to Minnesota. He was awarded the Silver Star twice for gallantry in combat in Germany in May and June 1945, respectively, during this tour. 

In 1948, Sieben joined the Minnesota Army National Guard, received a direct commission, and served as an Infantry Platoon Leader and Heavy Weapons Platoon Leader. 

In 1951, Sieben was called to active federal service and served for two years during the Korean War. Sieben served as a Regimental S2, Intelligence and Reconnaissance Platoon Leader, and Intelligence Officer.

In 1952, Sieben returned home and rejoined the Minnesota Army National Guard. During his years in the National Guard, Lt. Gen. Sieben served as a company commander, as well as a staff officer at the battalion, brigade, and division levels. He was also Commander, 1st Brigade, 47th Infantry Division.

In May 1975, Sieben was appointed Adjutant General of Minnesota by Gov. Wendell Anderson. He served in this position until April 1988.

Upon his retirement, Minnesota Governor Rudy Perpich proclaimed April 16, 1988, his retirement day, as Major General James G. Sieben Day.

Sieben's awards and decorations the Silver Star with Oak Leaf Cluster, Bronze Star, Purple Heart, Good Conduct Medal, American Campaign Medal, European-African-Middle Eastern Campaign Medal, World War II Victory Medal, Army of Occupation Medal (Germany), National Defense Service Medal, Armed Forces Reserve Medal, Army Reserve Components Achievement Medal, the Meritorious Service Medal, the Combat Infantryman Badge, the Norwegian Order of St. Olaf, the Swedish Distinguished Service Medal, as well as the Minnesota Distinguished Service Medal, the Minnesota Medal for Merit, and the Minnesota Commendation Medal.

Sieben's education included three years at the University of Minnesota, one year at Stanford University, and Command and General Staff College. Sieben also completed professional training courses including Combat Intelligence Staff Officer Course, Air-Ground Operations Course, Infantry Officer Career Course, Civil Disturbance Senior Officer Orientation Course,  Industrial College of the Armed Forces and National Security Management, and Brigade Staff Officer Course.

Diagnosed with cancer, Sieben died at the St. Joseph Hospice in Saint Paul, Minnesota.

Dates of promotion

Personal and family
Sieben was born into a political family. His father was a mayor of Hastings, Minnesota, as was his grandfather. His mother was a delegate to the Democratic National Convention in 1948. 

Sieben's older brother Harry Sieben Sr., twice ran for the US Congress, and was active in politics, including serving as a presidential appointee of US President John F. Kennedy. Sieben was uncle of Speaker of the Minnesota House of Representatives Harry A. Sieben, who also served as acting Adjutant General of the Minnesota National Guard during 2003, and Representative Mike Sieben, and great uncle of Katie Sieben, who served as a member of the Minnesota Senate.

General Sieben himself said, "I wouldn't care to run for anything. I found my niche in the military."

Sieben was married to his wife, Charlotte, and had three children, sons James and Terrance, and daughter Lisa.

References

1924 births
1998 deaths
People from Hastings, Minnesota
United States Army personnel of World War II
Military personnel from Minnesota
Recipients of the Silver Star
United States Army personnel of the Korean War
Recipients of the Meritorious Service Medal (United States)
National Guard (United States) generals
Deaths from cancer in Minnesota